League tables for teams participating in Kutonen, the seventh tier of the Finnish Soccer League system, in 2009.

2009 League tables

Helsinki

Section 1

Note: PPJ/Haastajat Withdrew

Section 2

Section 3

Section 4

Promotion play-offs

FC POHU/Playboys  -  Promoted

Source - Results & Final Table: SPL Helsinki

Section Winners Ranking play-offs

Source - Results & Final Table: SPL Helsinki

Uusimaa

Section 1

Section 2

Section 3

Section 4

Section 5

Section 6

Section 7

South-East Finland (Kaakkois-Suomi)

South Section

North Section

Northern Finland (Pohjois-Suomi)

Oulu

Central Ostrobothnia (Keski-Pohjanmaa)

Section A

Section B

Vaasa

Section 1

Section 2

Section 3

Tampere

Section 1

Section 2

Section 3

Turku

Section 1

Section 2

Section 3

Upper Section

Middle Section

Lower Section

References and sources
Finnish FA
ResultCode
Kutonen 

7
Kutonen seasons